Caroline Celestia Ingalls Swanzey (August 3, 1870 – June 2, 1946) was the third child of Charles and Caroline Ingalls, and was born in Montgomery County, Kansas. She was a younger sister of Laura Ingalls Wilder, who is known for her Little House books.

Biography
Carrie Ingalls Swanzey was described as small, thin and frail, and, according to Laura's books, suffered the most of all the Ingalls family members through the deprivations of the hard winter of 1880–1881. Carrie was not constantly ill, but she never enjoyed robust physical health during her life. She traveled to several places in her young adulthood seeking a more comfortable climate, including Colorado and Wyoming.

 
During her late-teen years Carrie was a typesetter for the De Smet News and, subsequently, other newspapers throughout the state for Edward Louis Senn. She settled in Keystone in 1911. In 1912, she married widower David N. Swanzey, who is best-remembered for his part in the naming of Mount Rushmore. She became stepmother to Swanzey's two children: Mary and Harold. Harold was one of the workers who helped carve Mount Rushmore, and his name can be found on the granite walls below the monument. He was later killed in a car accident in Keystone, South Dakota on April 9, 1938. David also died in 1938.

With her sister Grace's help, Carrie took care of their blind sister Mary after their mother's death in 1924.

Like Grace and Laura, she suffered from diabetes, and died of complications from the disease in Keystone, South Dakota, on June 2, 1946 at age 75. She was buried in the De Smet Cemetery.

In the media
Carrie was portrayed in the television adaptations of Little House on the Prairie by:
 Twins Lindsay and Sidney Greenbush in the television series Little House on the Prairie and its movie sequels
 Haley McCormick in Beyond the Prairie: The True Story of Laura Ingalls Wilder

References

External links

 Carrie Ingalls page
 
About the Ingalls Family (Sarah S. Uthoff)

1870 births
1946 deaths
American people of English descent
Deaths from diabetes
Ingalls family
Delano family
People from Montgomery County, Kansas
People from Pennington County, South Dakota
Cowgirl Hall of Fame inductees
People from De Smet, South Dakota

da:Laura Ingalls Wilder#Lillesøsteren Caroline Celestia Ingalls Swanzey (Carrie Ingalls)